Spades  form one of the four suits of playing cards in the standard French deck. It has the same shape as the leaf symbol in German-suited cards but its appearance is more akin to that of an upside down black heart with a stalk at its base. It symbolises the pike or halberd, two medieval weapons.

In French the suit of Spades is known as the Pique and in German as the Pik. It corresponds to the suit of Leaves  (Laub, Grün, Schippen or, in Bavaria, Gras) in the German suited playing cards. In Switzerland, the suit is known as Schuufle ("shovel") and in many German regions, e.g. the Rhineland as Schüppe/Schippe ("shovel").

In Bridge, Spades rank as the highest suit. In Skat and similar games, it is the second-highest suit.

Name 
The French name for this suit, pique ("pike"), meant, in the 14th century, a weapon formed by an iron spike placed at the end of a pike. For playing cards, the term may have been coined by analogy with the Latin symbol from which it is derived, the sword.

Sometimes it is an adaptation of "sword", hence the English name, Spades, and the Portuguese espadas.

Characteristics 
The spade symbol is a very stylized spearhead shape, pointing upwards, the bottom widening into two arcs of a circle and sweeping towards the centre to then form a sort of foot.

Generally, spades are black. They form one of the two major suits in  Bridge (with Hearts). In the official Skat tournament deck, spades are green, assuming the color of their German-deck equivalent.

The following gallery shows the spades in a 52-card deck of French playing cards. Not shown is the Knight of Spades used in Tarot card games:

Four-colour packs 

Four-colour packs are sometimes used in tournaments or online.
In four-colour packs Spades may be:
 black  in English Bridge and Poker packs and French and Swiss four-colour packs,
 green   in German Skat tournament packs or 
 blue  in some American Poker decks.

Coding 
The symbol ♠ is already in the computer code set CP437 and therefore also part of  Windows WGL4. In Unicode a black ♠ and a white ♤ Spade are defined:

References

Literature 
 Allan, Elkan and Hannah Mackay (2007). The Poker Encyclopedia. London: Portico. 

Card suits

da:Spar (kulør)